{{Automatic taxobox
|image = Illustration Ceratonia siliqua0.jpg
|image_caption = Carob tree (Ceratonia siliqua)
|taxon = Ceratonia
|authority = L.
|subdivision_ranks = Species
|subdivision = Selected species
Ceratonia oreothauma
†Ceratonia emarginataCeratonia siliqua}}Ceratonia  is small genus of flowering trees in the pea family, Fabaceae, endemic to the Mediterranean region and the Middle East.  Its best known member, the carob tree, is cultivated for its pods and has been widely introduced to regions with similar climates. The genus was long considered monotypic, but a second species, Ceratonia  oreothauma, was identified in 1979 from Oman and Somalia. It is in the tribe Umtizieae, subfamily Caesalpinioideae.

An obsolete name for Ceratonia was Acalis.

Fossil record
†Ceratonia emarginata'' fossils are known from the Miocene of Switzerland and Hungary.

References

Images

Caesalpinioideae
Fabaceae genera
Taxa named by Carl Linnaeus